Shítóu Xīqiān (700-790) was an 8th-century Chinese Chán (Zen) Buddhist teacher and author. All existing branches of Zen throughout the world are said to descend either from Shitou Xiqian or from his contemporary Mazu Daoyi.

Biography

Life
The details of Shítóu's life are found in traditional biographies. His years of life are conventionally given as 700 to 790. He was born in Gaoyao County in Guangdong with the surname Chen. 

At a young age, he became a student of the great Zen patriarch Huineng for a short time prior to the latter's death. Shítóu later became a disciple of Huineng's successor, Qingyuan Xingsi. After becoming, in turn, Xingsi's successor, Shítóu resided and taught at Nantai Temple on Mt. Nanyue Heng in Hunan. There he lived on top of a large rock, hence his first name Shítóu, which translates to "Stone-head." 

After his death, he was given the honorary posthumous name Wuji Dashi (無際大師).

Physical remains
There have been a series of disputed claims regarding the current location of Shitou's physical remains. There is a mummy at Mt. Sekito Temple in Japan which is said to be Shítóu's. Various Japanese sources state that this mummy was rescued by a Japanese traveller from a fire at a temple in Hunan during the chaos of the rebellion that overthrew the Qing Dynasty (1911–1912). Chinese sources often state instead that it was stolen by Japanese forces during the Second Sino-Japanese War (1937–1945). Researcher James Robson argues that there is little evidence Shitou's body was mummified and that the remains enshrined at Mt. Sekito Temple are likely those of a different monk also named Wuji.

Writings
Shítóu is credited with the authorship of two well-known Zen Buddhist poems. The Sandokai lays out a comprehensive view of the nature of truth. The Song of the Grass Hut is a paean to a life of secluded meditation.

Influence
Scholar Mario Poceski writes that Shítóu does not appear to have been influential or famous during his lifetime: 

Sayings to the effect that Shitou and Mazu were the two great masters of their day date from decades after their respective deaths. Shítóu's retrospective prominence owes much to the importance of Dongshan Liangjie, a 9th-century teacher who traced his lineage back to Shítóu.

See also
 Sandokai

References

Sources

 

Chan Buddhist monks
Chinese Zen Buddhists
700 births
790 deaths